Elmsley is a surname. Notable people with the surname include:

Alex Elmsley (1929–2006), British Magician and Computer programmer
James H. Elmsley (1895–1921), Canadian  Major General, Commander of the Canadian Siberian Expeditionary Force
John Elmsley, Chief Justice of Upper Canada (17961802) and Chief Justice of Lower Canada (18021805)
Peter Elmsley (1773–1825), English classical scholar
Peter Elmsley (bookseller) Elmsley or Elmsly (born 1736), bookseller from Aberdeenshire

See also
Drummond/North Elmsley, township in eastern Ontario, Canada in Lanark County
Elmsley House, the official residence of the Lieutenant Governor of Upper Canada and Ontario, Canada
South Elmsley Township, Ontario, township located within Leeds and Grenville United Counties in Eastern Ontario, Canada
Helmsley